Carlos Alberto Ezeta Salcedo (born 19 September 1970) is a Mexican politician from the Ecologist Green Party of Mexico. From 2010 to 2012 he served as Deputy of the LXI Legislature of the Mexican Congress representing Querétaro.

References

1970 births
Living people
Politicians from Querétaro
Ecologist Green Party of Mexico politicians
21st-century Mexican politicians
Universidad Iberoamericana alumni
Deputies of the LXI Legislature of Mexico
Members of the Chamber of Deputies (Mexico) for Querétaro